Tigase is an open source (GNU AGPL-3.0-only) project started by Artur Hefczyc in October 2004 to develop an XMPP server implementation in Java.

Initially the goal was to develop a fully compliant XMPP server with backward compatibility with an informal XMPP specification. In time the project has been split into smaller parts – server implementation, XML tools containing a parser for XML streams and a test suite with a built-in scripting language.  In summer 2006, the client-side library and application in Java have joined the Tigase project. In November 2013, Tigase added a REST API layer project, and later HTTP tools - AdminUI.

In 2018 IoT1 cloud was launched - bringing all XMPP and all Tigase software together to facilitate IoT devices communication.

Tigase is currently in active development - on 19th of December 2022 Tigase XMPP Server 8.3.0 was released.

Subprojects
Now Tigase consists of following subprojects:

Server 
Server-side related projects

Tigase XMPP Server – main XMPP server implementation
Tigase XMLTools – XML tools, parser simple XML database
Tigase Utils – Repository with common files used in other Tigase subprojects
Tigase TestSuite – suite of functional tests for XMPP servers
Tigase XMPP Server Command Line Management Tool – Command Line Management Tool
Tigase MUC - component allowing creating group chatrooms
Tigase PubSub - implementation of XEP-0060: Publish-Subscribe extension
Tigase Message Archiving - Component for the Tigase XMPP Server as the server component, implementing XEP-0136: Message Archiving
Tigase Socks5 Proxy - XEP-0065: SOCKS5 Bytestreams implementation for the Tigase XMPP Server component allowing file transfer between clients
Tigase STUN - implementation of STUN protocol
Tigase HTTP API - HTTP component providing REST API, web-based installer and AdminUI.

Client 

Tigase JaXMPP – XMPP client library
Tigase Swift XMPP client library - XMPP library written in Swift
StorkIM – Android XMPP client
BeagleIM - macOS XMPP client
SiskinIM - iOS XMPP client

See also
Extensible Messaging and Presence Protocol
Comparison of XMPP server software

References

External links
Tigase homepage
Projects tracking site

Instant messaging server software
Software using the GNU AGPL license
Software using the GPL license